Tomasz Kitliński (born 29 December 1965) is a Polish political philosopher, cultural and social analyst, and civic activist. He is a lecturer and trade unionist at Maria Curie-Sklodowska University and an author of books (Dream? Democracy! ), articles, petitions and letters of protest. In his research and teaching, he deals with contemporary society, culture and politics, intellectual history, literary and critical theory, art practice, religious studies and social anthropology. In his activism, he champions women's, LGBT, labour and refugee rights and participation.

Biography 

Tomasz Kitlinski holds his M.Phil. from the Paris Diderot University, where he prepared his thesis, supervised by Julia Kristeva. He conducted research under Hélène Cixous, Maria Janion and Julia Kristeva.

He was a Fulbright scholar at the New School for Social Research in New York, where he participated in the seminars of Ágnes Heller, Richard J. Bernstein and Jonathan Schell.  He also conducted research and presented a paper at the Courtauld Institute of Art, London.

Kitlinski is a member of Poland's Green Party.
At the University of Brighton, he moderated a meeting with Britain's only Green MP, Caroline Lucas. In a letter to the editor, published in the Guardian, he has written on the importance of Zygmunt Bauman's scholarly output.
In 2011 he curated Transeuropa Festival in Lublin, where he organised a series of queer, feminist and Jewish events, to which he invited Irena Grudzinska-Gross, Robert Biedroń, Kazimiera Szczuka, Anna Grodzka and Robert Kuwałek.

Kitlinski was cited by the New York Times.

He has been involved in filmmaking; Kitlinski collaborated with directors Helen Whitney, Raphael Lewandowski, Urszula Pieregonczuk, Grzegorz Linkowski and Piotr Brozek.

On 2019 Polish parliamentary election Kitliński was a candidate for the sejm from The Left. He was supported by Hubert Znajomski and received 2334 votes.

Books 
 Dream? Democracy! A Philosophy of Horror, Hope & Hospitality in Art & Action, Lublin: Maria Curie-Sklodowska Press, 2014 (table of contents:) 
 Love and Democracy: Reflections on the Queer Question in Poland (with Paweł Leszkowicz), Cracow: Aureus, 2005. 
 The Stranger Is within Ourselves: How to Love according to Julia Kristeva, Cracow: Aureus, 2001. 
 Love. Hate (with Dariusz Fodczuk and Chris Hurford), Lublin: Ex-Libris, 1991. 
 Parallel Lines (with Angus Reid), Wroclaw: Galeria x, 1990.

References

Bibliography
 Kitlinski's contribution, co-authored with Joe Lockard and Pawel Leszkowicz, to the NYU Press collection of essays: Laurent Berlant, Lisa Duggen (eds), Our Monica, Ourselves. New York: New York University Press, 2001 
 Sociologist Eric Fassin on Kitlinski's article, co-authored with Joe Lockard and Pawel Leszkowicz, about Monica Lewinsky:
 Kitlinski's contribution to the Palgrave Macmillan collection of essays: Angela Jones (ed), A Critical Inquiry into Queer Utopias. New York: Palgrave Macmillan, 2013 
 Kitlinski's biography at the Courtauld Institute of Art, University of London:  
 Kitlinski's biography in the scholarly journal Inter Alia: 
 Kitlinski's biography at Gender Center, Polish Academy of Sciences: 
 Sociologist Dota Szymborska-Dyrda reviews Tomasz Kitlinski and Pawel Leszkowicz's book Love and Democracy: Reflections on the Queer Question in Poland: 

1965 births
The Greens (Poland) politicians
Living people
Polish LGBT rights activists
Maria Curie-Skłodowska University alumni
Academic staff of Maria Curie-Skłodowska University
21st-century Polish philosophers
Fulbright alumni